The 2018–19 Illinois State Redbirds men's basketball team represented Illinois State University during the 2018–19 NCAA Division I men's basketball season. The Redbirds, led by seventh-year head coach Dan Muller, played their home games at Redbird Arena in Normal, Illinois as a member of the Missouri Valley Conference. They finished the season 17–16, 9–9 in conference play, to finish in a tie for the fifth place. As the number seven seed in the MVC tournament, they defeated Evansville in the opening round and were beaten by Drake in the quarterfinal round.

Previous season 
The Redbrids finished the 2017–18 NCAA Division I men's basketball season 18–15, 10–8 in MVC play, to finish in a tie for third place. They were the number three seed and defeated Missouri State in their quarterfinal game and Southern Illinois in their semifinal game to advance to the championship game of the MVC tournament where they lost to Loyola–Chicago.

Offseason

Departures

Arrivals

Transfers

Recruiting Class

Roster

Schedule and results

|-
!colspan=9 style=|Exhibition Season

|-
!colspan=9 style=|Non-Conference Regular Season

|-
!colspan=9 style=|Missouri Valley Conference Regular Season

|-
!colspan=9 style=|State FarmMissouri Valley Conference {MVC} tournament
|-

|-

Source

References

Illinois State Redbirds men's basketball seasons
Illinois State Redbirds men's basketball
Illinois State Redbirds men's basketball
Illinois State Redbirds